Božidar Alić (24 December 1954 – 3 March 2020) was a Croatian actor.

Biography 

Alić was born on 24 December 1954 in Zagreb. He graduated from the Academy of Dramatic Arts of the University of Zagreb.

His acting career was damaged by his right-wing political stances. He was ostracized by the Croatian association of dramatic artists for his statement in which he portrayed political opponents of Kolinda Grabar-Kitarović as Chetniks and Serb lovers. After this incident he left the Association.

Personal life
Božidar Alić married his wife Sanda in 2007. She gave birth to their son, Ratimir, in 2010.

Alić was known for his conservative political views. He supported Kolinda Grabar-Kitarović at the 2014–15 Croatian presidential election.

He died in Zagreb on 3 March 2020, at age 65.

Filmography

Television

Film

References

External links

1954 births
2020 deaths
20th-century Croatian male actors
21st-century Croatian male actors
Croatian male film actors
Croatian male stage actors
Croatian male television actors
Croatian soldiers
Male actors from Zagreb
Military personnel of the Croatian War of Independence
University of Zagreb alumni